Olga Ianchuk was the defending champion, but chose not to participate.

Maja Chwalińska won the title, defeating Anastasiya Komardina in the final, 6–3, 6–0.

Seeds

Draw

Finals

Top half

Bottom half

References

Main Draw

WSG Open - Singles
WSG Open